Fifty Shades Freed is the third and final installment of the erotic romance Fifty Shades Trilogy by British author E. L. James. After accepting entrepreneur CEO Christian Grey's proposal in Fifty Shades Darker, Anastasia Steele must adjust not only to married life but to her new husband's wealthy lifestyle and controlling nature. The paperback edition was first published in April 2012.

Plot  
Anastasia 'Ana' Steele and Christian Grey return to Seattle after a long honeymoon. Christian is upset to find that Ana has kept her maiden name at work. After some resistance, Ana relents and changes her name at work to Grey after realizing how important it is to Christian. As a belated wedding gift, Christian gives Seattle Independent Publishing to Ana, and plans to rename it Grey Publishing.

While Christian is on a business trip in New York, Anastasia goes out for a drink with longtime friend Kate Kavanagh, doing so against Christian's wishes. Returning home, she finds that her former boss, Jack Hyde, who was fired for attempting to sexually assault her, has been apprehended by the security staff. Duct tape is found in his pocket and in his van there are tranquilizers and a ransom note—all indications that he had intended to kidnap her. Jack is arrested. Angry with Ana for defying him, Christian cuts short his New York business trip and returns to Seattle. Furious that Ana reneged on her promise to have Kate over rather than go out, an upset Christian sulks while Ana sleeps. Eventually, the two argue and Ana berates him for being overly controlling and possessive. She demands more freedom and access to her friends. Christian finally relents after realizing how much Ana's friends mean to her and that Ana did the right thing by staying with Kate rather than at home. Soon after, Christian surprises her with a trip to Aspen, with Kate, Elliot, Mia, and Kate's brother, Ethan. While there, Elliot proposes to Kate, and she accepts.

Ana's step-father, Ray, is in a medically-induced coma after a car accident. When he awakens a few days later, Ana and Christian arrange to move him to Seattle to recover. It is also Ana's birthday weekend, and Christian surprises her with all her family and friends at a dinner. He gives her a charm bracelet with the charms representing all their "firsts" including an ice cream cone to represent their "vanilla" relationship. Christian also gives her an  Audi R8. Soon after, Ana learns that she is pregnant. Christian angrily accuses her of getting pregnant on purpose and leaves. He returns early the next morning drunk, claiming Ana will choose the baby - whom he believes to be a boy - over him. Ana says it could be a girl, though Christian refuses to accept that due to his sexist and chauvinistic nature. Ana becomes furious when she discovers a text message on Christian's phone from his ex-lover Elena Lincoln, the woman who seduced him when he was fifteen and introduced him to the BDSM lifestyle. The message indicates they met for a drink.

The next two mornings, Anastasia and Christian barely speak to each other: Christian is angry over the unplanned pregnancy; Anastasia is upset about his late-night encounter with Elena, though Christian insists their relationship is long-since over. When Christian is away on a business for a few days, Ana receives a call from Jack Hyde. He has kidnapped Mia Grey and demands $5 million in two hours. He warns Ana not to tell anyone or he will kill Mia.

Anastasia feigns illness and returns home to escape her bodyguard, Sawyer. She takes a gun and goes to the bank. While collecting the money, the suspicious bank manager calls Christian, who believes Ana is leaving him. To protect Mia's life, Ana lies to Christian, saying she is leaving him to raise the baby alone. Hyde instructs Ana to leave her phone but she tricks him by taking the bank manager's phone instead and dropping it in the trash. She leaves via the back entrance to a waiting car, shocked that Hyde's accomplice is Elizabeth Morgan, her co-worker. When handing over the money, Hyde tries to kill Ana out of vengeance for losing his job, causing Elizabeth to feel guilty for being involved. Angered by his behavior and his hurting Ana, Elizabeth argues with Hyde. On the ground and bruised, Ana shoots Hyde in the leg. As Ana starts to black out she hears Christian calling her name.

Ana wakes three days later in the hospital with Christian at her side. Though he is angry at Ana's recklessness and still anxious about fatherhood, he realizes how important their baby is to her, and they reconcile. Ana returns home the next day. Christian learns from his private investigator, Welch, that he and Hyde had the same foster family. He tells Ana about how he met and was seduced by Elena. By introducing him to the world of BDSM, Elena helped Christian learn to take control of his life. If she had not intervened, he would still be plagued with horrible memories of his mother and would never have been able to control his life. Ana feels guilty for her behavior when he explains how he ended up seeing Elena. He had been looking for his psychiatrist, Dr. Flynn, because he needed help and when he could not contact Flynn, Christian wound up at Elena's salon to talk to someone about his problems. Elena happened to be at the salon while she was closing. She knew Christian and Ana had had a fight about the pregnancy. Elena took him to her favorite bar for a drink and to help him relax. Although she made a pass at him, Elena realized that Christian loved Ana and finally agreed to leave on good terms. He reassures her that she did the right thing to call him out for his behavior because Dr. Flynn had been right that he still has a lot of growing up to do.

The next day, a furious Christian discovers from Welsh that Elena's ex-husband, Eric Lincoln, had bailed Jack from jail out of spite for her affair with Christian. Christian tells Ana that after learning about the affair, Eric severely beat Elena and divorced her. Despite Christian's urging, Elena refused to press charges against Eric out of guilt for the affair. Christian retaliated by buying out Eric Lincoln's logging company to sell it off. It is also learned Elizabeth confessed to police that she was blackmailed by Hyde to be his accomplice. (However, her ultimate fate remains a mystery.)

Seven months later Ana and Christian have a son named Theodore Raymond Grey, nicknamed Teddy. Two years later Ana is six months pregnant with their second child, a daughter whom they decide to name Phoebe Grey. 
Elliot and Kate have married and have a two-month-old daughter named Ava. At the end, after having BDSM sex, Ana and Christian are getting ready to celebrate Teddy's second birthday with their family and friends.

Characters

Reception
Fifty Shades Freed entered The New York Times Best Seller list at number three. In the UK the novel sold over two million copies.

Film adaptation

Sam Taylor-Johnson, the director of the film adaptation of the first installment of the book series, Fifty Shades of Grey, confirmed on 6 February 2015 that both Fifty Shades Freed and the second book in the trilogy, Fifty Shades Darker, would also be adapted for film. In November 2015, Universal Studios announced that both films would be shot back-to-back with principal photography scheduled to commence in early 2016. The film was scheduled to be released on 9 February 2018.

References

External links
 Official author page

2012 British novels
British erotic novels
British novels adapted into films
British romance novels
Novels set in Colorado
Novels set in New York City
Novels set in Provence
Novels set in Seattle
Women's erotica and pornography
Works based on Twilight (novel series)
Fifty Shades novels
Vintage Books books